Özlem Özçelik-İşseven (born 1 January 1972 in Karşıyaka, İzmir) is a Turkish volleyball player. She is 190 cm and played as middle blocker.
Özlem played 312 times for national team. She also played for Vakıfbank Güneş Sigorta, Emlak Bankası, Tuborg, Eczacıbaşı, Fenerbahçe Acıbadem, Türk Telekom, Galatasaray Medical Park in Turkey and Dynamo Moscow in Russia.

Individual awards
 2005 European Championship "Best Blocker"

See also
 Turkish women in sports

References

External links
 FIVB Profile
 Türk Telekom Ankara Official Website Profile
 

1972 births
Living people
Sportspeople from İzmir
Turkish women's volleyball players
VakıfBank S.K. volleyballers
Emlak Bankası volleyballers
Eczacıbaşı volleyball players
Fenerbahçe volleyballers
Türk Telekom volleyballers
Galatasaray S.K. (women's volleyball) players
Beşiktaş volleyballers
Turkish expatriate volleyball players
Turkish expatriate sportspeople in Russia
Mediterranean Games gold medalists for Turkey
Mediterranean Games medalists in volleyball
Competitors at the 2005 Mediterranean Games
20th-century Turkish sportswomen
21st-century Turkish sportswomen